Eckersmühlen station is a railway station in the Eckersmühlen district of the municipality of Roth, located in the Roth district in Middle Franconia, Germany.

References

Railway stations in Bavaria
Buildings and structures in Roth (district)